The double-banded courser (Rhinoptilus africanus), also known as the two-banded courser, is a species of bird in the family Glareolidae.

Description
The bird's crown is pale and streaked with brown/black feathers.  A narrow black stripe extends from the base of the bill, through the eye to the nape. The cheeks, chin, throat and neck are buff/white flecked with dark brown. The feather of the back and wing coverts are sandy brown with dark centres and broadly edged with white/buff. The short bill is blackish, eyes are dark brown and the legs and feet are pale grey.

Distribution and habitat
The double-banded courser is found in Ethiopia, Somalia, South Africa, and Tanzania. The bird is widespread enough to have practically no chance of becoming endangered or extinct.
The double-banded courser lives and breeds in flat, stony or gravelly, semi-desert terrains with firm, sandy soil and tufty grass or thorn scrub.

Behaviour

Breeding
Double-banded coursers breed in monogamous pairs.  Breeding begins after a mating dance where the male dances in semicircles around the female.  The female then lays one egg, which the parents take hour-long shifts incubating.  After about twenty-five days, the egg hatches. The chicks leave the nest within 24 hours of hatching, although staying close to the nest until 3–4 days old, at which point it joins its parents. Both adults feed the chick with small insects until it becomes self-providing at about 5–6 weeks old.

The breeding season varies by country:

Ethiopia - April–June; Somalia - February–July (mainly May–June); Tanzania - November; South Africa - all year, peaking in October–November.

Feeding
The bird eats mostly insects, such as ants, termites, and beetles.
 
It catches its prey by quickly running after it and jabbing with its bill.

Subspecies

There are eight subspecies of Rhinoptilus africanus:

R. a. raffertyi, (Mearns, 1915): Eritrea, eastern Ethiopia & Djibouti
R. a. hartingi, (Sharpe, 1893): southeast Ethiopia, Somalia
R. a. gracilis, (Fischer & Reichenow, 1884): Kenya & Tanzania
R a. bisignatus, (Hartlaub, 1865): southwest Angola
R. a. erlangeri, (Niethammer & Wolters, 1966): northwest Namibia
R. a. traylori, (Irwin, 1963): northeast Botswana
R. a. africanus, (Temminck, 1807): eastern Namibia, central & southeast Botswana & northern South Africa
R. a. granti, (Sclater, 1921): western South Africa

References

External links 

Image at ADW
 Double-banded courser - Species text in The Atlas of Southern African Birds.

double-banded courser
Birds of East Africa
Birds of Southern Africa
double-banded courser
Taxonomy articles created by Polbot
Taxobox binomials not recognized by IUCN
Taxa named by Coenraad Jacob Temminck